Mid Sussex is a local government district in the English non-metropolitan county of West Sussex, within the historic county of Sussex. It contains the towns of East Grinstead, Haywards Heath and Burgess Hill.

The district was created on 1 April 1974 from parts of East Sussex: the urban districts of Cuckfield, Burgess Hill, and East Grinstead and nearly all of Cuckfield Rural, the far north-west of which was transferred to Crawley.

The district borders the Tandridge district of Surrey to the north, Wealden and Lewes districts to the east, and Brighton and Hove to the south, all in East Sussex, and Horsham district to the west and Crawley, northwest, equally in West Sussex.

The Prime Meridian passes through the district. The district contains most headwaters of the River Ouse, Sussex and its largest body of water is Ardingly reservoir which is used by watersports clubs.  The north of the area is the High Weald and has sections of Ashdown Forest.

Civil parishes
Within the Mid Sussex District are 24 civil parishes:

History
Population increased substantially in the 19th century, with most of this increase in the most urban areas and leading by its close to urban districts, town-based and rural districts, multi-village-based.

Mid Sussex was first used, in 1885, as another name for the Lewes constituency when Sussex representation was reformed to nine approximately equal electorate seats.

The first Parliamentary mention of a Mid Sussex body of any sort is in 1907, to the Mid Sussex Joint Water District, an amalgamation of private water companies to provide safe, treated, piped water.

Sussex has been divided into East Sussex and West Sussex for taxation since the late medieval period but this divide changed for the first and most recent time in 1972.  Changes were provided for under a 1972 Act, all major proposals debated in outline, and made in detail in its associated Order.

Mid Sussex's change in county was argued under the Redcliffe-Maud Report's Planning Area enhancing a Second Wilson ministry plan with support from locally resident Lords and of the Heath ministry.  Under this plan West Sussex gained an irregular swathe of East Sussex as far as East Grinstead in the north and in its initially passed form, Crawley would have gained two parishes in Surrey instead of the Gatwick part of these – mostly reversed due to a local poll, before its 1974 implementation, with the Charlwood and Horley Act 1974.  East to West Sussex land re-designation was kept with the stated aim of uniting all areas affected by the projected major Crawley and Gatwick Airport economy under one supervisory local authority.

The decision was controversial but moved through the House of Lords from the despatch box by Lord Belstead, a well-respected Minister in the Lords:

Home ownership
Homes owned by their occupants, with or without a loan, make up more than 85% of Mid Sussex housing.   Mid Sussex's residents had the lowest burden of social housing, at 0.5% of housing stock, at the time of the census, a district which is approximately 30 minutes by its fast railway services from the area with the highest such proportion covering London Bridge station, the London Borough of Southwark (having 31.2% social housing) and from a creative and self-declared, progressive authority with 9.8% social housing and 28% of its housing privately rented, Brighton and Hove.

In terms of rented housing Mid Sussex at the 2011 census ranked 216th out of in terms of 327 local authorities in England.  The proportion of homes which were rented as investments by non-occupants was higher than several other semi-rural districts of Sussex, with 11.7% of housing stock speculatively acquired in this way or to provide for those unable to obtain mortgage finance and 1.0% was let out to residents on either public or private shared ownership schemes, close to the national average.  These figures are those of the 2011 census.

Local politics
Mid Sussex District Council elections are held every four years. The District Council has been under Conservative Party (UK) control since 1999. The 2019 Mid Sussex District Council elections were held on Thursday 2 May, the results were as follows: 34 Conservatives, 13 Liberal Democrats, 3 Greens and 4 Independents. The Leader of the council is Councillor Jonathan Ash-Edwards.

The parliamentary constituency of Mid Sussex covers most (but not all) of the district, and is held by the Conservative Party. The incumbent Member of Parliament (MP) is Mims Davies who was elected in the 2019 general election, succeeding Sir Nicholas Soames, the grandson of former Prime Minister Sir Winston Churchill, and a former junior minister in the Government of Sir John Major (1990–97). The southernmost part of the district, including Hassocks and Hurstpierpoint falls within Arundel and South Downs whose MP is Andrew Griffith. The north western part of the district, including Ardingly, Balcombe, Copthorne and Crawley Down falls within the Horsham constituency whose MP is Jeremy Quin.

See also

References

 
Non-metropolitan districts of West Sussex